Bangi is a federal constituency in Hulu Langat District, Selangor, Malaysia, that has been represented in the Dewan Rakyat since 2018.

The federal constituency was created in the 2018 redistribution and is mandated to return a single member to the Dewan Rakyat under the first past the post voting system. 

With a total population of nearly 700,000, Bangi is the most populous parliamentary constituency in Malaysia.

Demographics

History

Polling districts
According to the federal gazette issued on 31 October 2022, the Bangi constituency is divided into 62 polling districts.

Representation history

State constituency

Current state assembly members

Local governments

Election results

References

Selangor federal constituencies